This is a list of world mini-flyweight boxing champions (also known as minimumweight or strawweight), as recognized by the four major sanctioning organizations in boxing:

 The World Boxing Association (WBA), established in 1921 as the National Boxing Association (NBA). The WBA often recognize up to two world champions in a given weight class; Super champion and Regular champion.
 The World Boxing Council (WBC), established in 1963.
 The International Boxing Federation (IBF), established in 1983.
 The World Boxing Organization (WBO), established in 1988.

IBF

WBC

WBA

WBO

See also
 List of British world boxing champions

External links

mini-flyweight
World mini-flyweight boxing champions
World boxing champions by weight class